Lauren Selby, (born 18 July 1984 in Sawbridgeworth) is a professional squash player who represents England. She reached a career-high world ranking of World No. 34 in October 2012. Her brother is the professional squash player Daryl Selby. She attended Brentwood School in Brentwood, Essex during her secondary school years. She also coaches at Ardleigh Squash Club, Essex.

References

External links 

English female squash players
Living people
1984 births
People from Sawbridgeworth